Caraquet Bay is situated in the northeast of the Canadian province of New Brunswick. It is bordered on the south by the town of Caraquet and the village of Bertrand, to the south by the parish of New Bandon, to the north by the village of Maisonnette and to the northwest by the Baie des Chaleurs. Caraquet Island is located between the two bays. There are a number of beaches on the bay, as well as oyster farms and the port of Caraquet.  Caraquet Bay flows into the Caraquet River and the Du Nord River

There are two theories about the origin of the bay's name. Either Caraquet is a word in the Mi'kmaq language meaning "where two rivers meet", or it comes from a type of ship, the carrack. Governor Nicolas Denys was the first to mention Caraquet, in 1672.

See also
List of lighthouses in New Brunswick

References 

Atlas of Canada - Baie de Caraquet

External links
 Aids to Navigation Canadian Coast Guard

Bays of New Brunswick
Landforms of Gloucester County, New Brunswick
Lighthouses in New Brunswick